An Auto and No Money (German: Ein Auto und kein Geld) is a 1932 German comedy film directed by Jacob Fleck and Luise Fleck and starring Paul Kemp, Dina Gralla and Igo Sym. It was shot at the Hunnia Studios in Budapest. The film's sets were designed by the art director Max Heilbronner.

Cast
 Paul Kemp as Peter Knopf, Auslagendekorateur
 Dina Gralla as 	Mimi
 Igo Sym as 	Marchese della Serra
 Jakob Tiedtke as 	Kersten, Fabrikant
 Liselotte Schaak as 	Mary, seine Tochter
 Walter Bach as 	Bobby
 Hugo Döblin as 	S. Piper
 Oscar Beregi Sr.		
 Gyula Kabos
 Gusztáv Vándory

References

Bibliography
 Klaus, Ulrich J. Deutsche Tonfilme: Jahrgang 1932. Klaus-Archiv, 1988.
 Waldman, Harry. Nazi Films in America, 1933-1942. McFarland, 2008.

External links

1932 films
Films of the Weimar Republic
1932 comedy films
German comedy films
1930s German-language films
Films directed by Luise Fleck
Films directed by Jacob Fleck
German black-and-white films
1930s German films